The Stranger on the Bridge is a 2015 documentary film, produced and directed by Sam Forsdike and Richard Bentley of Postcard Productions. It was shown on Channel 4 on 4 May 2014.
 
It is an adaptation of a promotional film made in 2014  for the charity Rethink Mental Illness  called Finding Mike.

Synopsis 
The documentary follows 26 year old Jonny Benjamin as he tries to find the man who dissuaded him from taking his own life by  jumping from Waterloo Bridge in London in 2008.
 
Benjamin had nicknamed the man 'Mike', since he was not able to remember his actual name.

Reception 
The reception for Stranger on the Bridge was largely positive receiving reviews in The Guardian, The Daily Telegraph and The Independent.

The Radio Times called it a “remarkable, joyous, painful and ultimately life-affirming film”.

The combination of the documentary and preceding campaign is estimated to have reached 319 million people worldwide.

Adaptations 
The story of Benjamin's search was rumoured to be considered for a Hollywood film. The rights have also been acquired by Pan Macmillan's wellness and lifestyle imprint Bluebird as part of a 2-book deal.

Awards 
 Win - Best Single Documentary - Televisual Bulldog Awards
 Nominated - Best Newcomer Award Sam Forsdike - The Grierson Trust British Documentary Award
 Nominated - Documentary Awards - The Grierson Trust British Documentary Award
 Nominated - Breakthrough Award - Behind the Screen - Royal Televisual Society

References 

Channel 4 documentaries
2010s biographical films
2010s British films